Lady Constance Mary Butler (26 March 1879 — 20 April 1949) was an Anglo-Irish noblewoman, yachtswoman and antiquarian. Medical volunteer work during World War I led to a later career in radiography.

Early life and family
Constance Mary Butler was the daughter of James Butler, 3rd Marquess of Ormonde and Lady Elizabeth Harriet Grosvenor. Her grandfathers were John Butler, 2nd Marquess of Ormonde and Hugh Grosvenor, 1st Duke of Westminster. Her great-grandfather, George Sutherland-Leveson-Gower, 2nd Duke of Sutherland, was a member of the Leveson-Gower family. Another great-grandfather, Edward Paget, was the British Governor of Ceylon. Constance's older sister Beatrice married Sir Reginald Pole-Carew, an officer in the British Army.

Career
Both of her parents were active in yachting, and Lady Constance was recognized as a "keen yachtswoman" and a "wonderful swimmer." "Lady Ormonde and her daughter always wear, when yachting, the most severely simple and workmanlike clothes." She was also considered a  beauty among the noblewomen of her generation, and what she wore (on dressier occasions than yachting) was reported in detail on society pages.

She and her sister attended the coronation of King George V and Queen Mary in 1911, seated in a box set aside for "personal friends of the Queen and Queen Alexandra." During World War I she managed a Red Cross depot for medical and surgical supplies, and collaborated with Bishop John Henry Bernard on translating, editing, and publishing the Charters of Duiske Abbey.

Later in life, Lady Constance Butler remained interested in medical work, and became an expert on radiography, heading the x-ray department at St. Andrew's Hospital in London by 1924.

Personal life
Although she and her sister could not (as women) inherit their father's title and properties, in 1898 they inherited a comfortable London house, land in Tipperary, and a fortune from another relative, the last Lord Lismore, whose sons died young. Lady Constance Mary Butler died in 1949, aged 70 years. Sir Richard Carew Pole, 13th Baronet, of Antony House in Cornwall, is her grand-nephew.

References

External links
Photographs from a 1902 royal shooting party at Sandringham House, including Lady Constance, King Haakon VII of Norway, King Edward VII, Kaiser Wilhelm II of Germany, King George V, and other notables; in the collection of the Victoria & Albert Museum. 
William Murphy, "Archbishop Bernard, Lady Constance Butler and the Charters of Duiske" Ossory, Laois and Leinster 4(2010): 185–201.

1879 births
1949 deaths
British women in World War I
Daughters of British marquesses